The 2006 Copa Nextel Stock Car was the 28th Stock Car Brasil season. It began on April 9 at the Interlagos and ended on December 10 at the same circuit, after twelve rounds.

Teams and drivers
All drivers were Brazilian-registered.

Race calendar and results
All races were held in Brazil, excepting the round at Autódromo Juan y Oscar Gálvez, which held in Argentina.

Drivers' championship

References

Stock Car Brasil
Stock Car Brasil seasons